Gmina Marciszów is a rural gmina (administrative district) in Kamienna Góra County, Lower Silesian Voivodeship, in south-western Poland.

Neighbouring gminas
Gmina Marciszów is bordered by the gminas of Bolków, Czarny Bór, Janowice Wielkie, Kamienna Góra and Stare Bogaczowice.

Villages
The gmina contains the villages of Ciechanowice, Domanów, Marciszów, Nagórnik, Pastewnik, Pustelnik, Sędzisław, Świdnik and Wieściszowice.

References

Marciszow
Kamienna Góra County